Jules Mathew Le Lievre (17 August 1933 – 17 January 2016) was a New Zealand rugby union player.

A prop, Le Lievre represented  at a provincial level, and was a member of the New Zealand national side, the All Blacks, from 1962 to 1964. He played 25 matches for the All Blacks but only appeared in one international. He died in Christchurch on 17 January 2016, aged 82.

References

1933 births
2016 deaths
Sportspeople from Akaroa
New Zealand people of French descent
People educated at St Bede's College, Christchurch
New Zealand rugby union players
New Zealand international rugby union players
Canterbury rugby union players
Rugby union props
Rugby union players from Canterbury, New Zealand